Emily Reuben is a reporter and presenter on British television's Now with CNN.

Biography
She previously presented More4 News. In 2004, she married Nick Crossley.

Reuben has one son, Eli, who has Duchenne muscular dystrophy and two daughters. Reuben founded the Duchenne Children's Trust, which later merged with charity Joining Jack to form Duchenne UK, the leading Duchenne muscular dystrophy charity in the UK, dedicated to finding better treatments and a cure for the condition.

References

External links
 Working Week: Emily Reuben, Press Gazette, 1 December 2006
 Reports by Reuben on Channel4.com
 Search for reports by Reuben on itnsource.com
 Search for reports by Reuben on channel4.com

Living people
ITN newsreaders and journalists
CNN people
Year of birth missing (living people)